"Toi c'est moi" is a song by French singer Priscilla from her third album Une fille comme moi. The song reached number 16 in France.

It was the second single from that album. The album came out in February 2004, and the single two months later, in April.

Track listing 

Extras: "Priscilla en studio" (Video)

Charts

References 

2004 songs
2004 singles
Priscilla Betti songs
Jive Records singles
Songs written by Philippe Osman
Songs written by Bertrand Châtenet